Jason Spencer (born 1974) is an American politician and physician assistant.

Jason Spencer may also refer to:

 Jason Spencer (murder victim) (1989–2007), an English teenager who was stabbed to death
 Jason Spencer, founding member of the American band Wilson
 Jason Spencer, Australian who won the 2010 Sir Peter Ustinov Television Scriptwriting Award
 Jason Spencer, American baseball player. Florida State University, St Louis Cardinals